The Men competition at the 2018 World Allround Speed Skating Championships was held on 10 and 11 March 2018.

Results

500 m
The race was started on 10 March at 16:15.

5000 m
The race was started on 10 March at 18:14.

1500 m
The race was started on 11 March at 13:29.

10000 m
The race was started on 11 March at 15:10.

Overall standings
After all events.

References

Men
speed skating